The BL 12 inch Gun Mark X was a British 45-calibre naval gun which was mounted as primary armament on battleships and battlecruisers from 1906.

History 

Mk X continued the trend of lengthening gun barrels as far as new construction methods would permit, in order to allow more cordite propellant to be used to attain higher projectile velocities.

Subsequent British attempts to further increase the power of 12-inch guns led to failure with the 50-calibre Mk XI and Mk XII guns; the Mk X was the last successful 12-inch British gun.

Naval use 
Mk X guns were mounted in the following ships which served throughout World War I:
 s, laid down 1905, completed 1908
 Battleship , laid down 1905, completed 1906
 s, laid down 1906, completed 1908–1909
 s, laid down 1906, completed 1909
 s, laid down 1909, completed 1911–1913

World War I use ashore 
From 1917 several Mk X guns were deployed ashore on the section of the Belgian coast still held by the Allies, near Nieuwpoort. They were part of the "Royal Naval Siege Guns" under the command of Admiral Sir Reginald Bacon, and were used for attacking German heavy gun batteries.

Ammunition

See also 
 List of naval guns

Weapons of comparable role, performance and era 
 305mm/45 Modèle 1906 gun French equivalent
 EOC 12 inch /45 naval gun Elswick Ordnance Company equivalent
 12"/45 caliber Mark 5 gun US equivalent

Notes

References

Bibliography 
 "Range Tables for His Majesty's Fleet, 1910. February, 1911"
 Treatise on Ammunition, 1915

External links 

 Tony DiGiulian, British 12"/45 (30.5 cm) Mark X

 

Naval guns of the United Kingdom
World War I naval weapons of the United Kingdom
305 mm artillery
Vickers